Banque publique d'investissement (literally [French] Public Investment Bank, also known as Bpifrance, BPI Groupe S.A.) is a French public investment bank. It is a joint venture of two public entities: the Caisse des dépôts et consignations and EPIC BPI-Groupe, formerly EPIC OSEO.

The former subsidiary of EPIC OSEO, OSEO S.A., became a subsidiary of Bpifrance known as Bpifrance Financement.

The bank was directly supervised by the European Central Bank due to its size.

Subsidiaries and minority interests
Bpifrance Financement S.A. (90%) (ex-OSEO S.A.)
Bpifrance Régions (99%)
Bpifrance Participations (100%) (ex-Fonds stratégique d'investissement)
Bpifrance Investissement (100%) (ex-CDC Entreprises)
Orange S.A. (shared with APE as the largest shareholders (23.04%); the rest publicly floats)
FT1CI (79.2%, the rest owned by another French agency CEA)
STMicroelectronics Holding (50%; joint venture with Italian government)
STMicroelectronics (27.6% as the largest shareholders; the rest publicly floats)
Areva (3.32%)
Vallourec (7.10% as largest shareholders)
Stellantis (6.2%)
Constellium (10%)

See also
Agence des participations de l'État

References

External links
 

2012 establishments in France
Banks established in 2012
Financial services companies established in 2012
European investment banks
Banks of France
Government-owned companies of France
Sovereign wealth funds
Banks under direct supervision of the European Central Bank